Get Off My Foot is a 1935 British comedy film, directed by William Beaudine and starring Max Miller and Chili Bouchier.  It is classed as a lost film.

The film was a quota quickie production based on a play Money by Wire by Edward A. Paulton.

Plot
A Smithfield Market porter believes he was responsible for his friend's death.  He flees to the country and obtains the position of butler with a wealthy family, and falls in love with one of the maids, played by Bouchier.

Cast
 Max Miller as Herbert Cronk
 Chili Bouchier as Marie
 Jane Carr as Helen Rawlingcourt
 Norma Varden as Mrs. Rawlingcourt
 Morland Graham as Mr. Rawlingcourt
 Reginald Purdell as Joe
 Vera Bogetti as Matilda
 Wally Patch as Tramp

References

External links
 
 Get Off My Foot at BFI Film & TV Database
 Miller's Movies at Max Miller information site

1935 films
1935 comedy films
British comedy films
Films directed by William Beaudine
Lost British films
British black-and-white films
British films based on plays
1935 lost films
Lost comedy films
1930s British films